The Hamilton Case is a 2003 novel by Australian author Michelle de Kretser. The book won the Commonwealth Writers Prize (SE Asia & Pacific) and the Encore Award (UK). The work centres on the lives of the somewhat eccentric Obeysekere family, in particular Sam, and the 1930s setting explores themes of colonization in Ceylon, now called Sri Lanka. Michelle de Kretser is originally from Sri Lanka. The title refers to a fictional case involving the murder of an English planter in Ceylon, which Sam Obeysekere, a lawyer, attempts to solve. Time Magazine named the book as one of the five best novels of 2004, referring to the date published in the United States.

Awards
Frankfurt Literaturpreis, 2007, winner 
International Dublin Literary Award, 2005, longlist
Tasmania Pacific Region Prize, Fiction Prize, 2005, winner 
Festival Awards for Literature (SA), Dymocks Booksellers Award for Fiction, 2004, shortlist
Believer Book Award, 2004, shortlist
Commonwealth Writers Prize, South East Asia and South Pacific Region, Best Book, 2004, winner 
Encore Award, 2004, winner 
Time Magazine's Best Books of the Year, 2004, Fiction #5
Barnes & Noble Discover Great New Writers Awards, Fiction, 2004, second 
The Age Book of the Year Award, Fiction Prize, 2003, shortlist
Victorian Premier's Literary Award, The Vance Palmer Prize for Fiction, 2003, shortlist

References

2003 Australian novels
Australian crime novels
Alfred A. Knopf books
Novels set in Sri Lanka
Fiction set in the 1930s